The 2019 Rugby Borough Council election took place on 2 May 2019 to elect members of Rugby Borough Council in England. This was on the same day as other local elections.

Results summary

Ward results

Admirals & Cawston

Benn

Bilton

Coton & Boughton

Dunsmore

Eastlands

Hillmorton

Leam Valley

New Bilton

Newbold & Brownsover

Paddox

Revel & Binley Woods

Rokeby & Overslade

Wolston & The Lawfords

References

2019 English local elections
2019
2010s in Warwickshire